Ademilson Silva Marques (born November 22, 1985 in São Luís), commonly known as Mimica, is a Brazilian footballer. He currently plays for Altos.

Honours

Sampaio Corrêa
Campeonato Maranhense: 2010, 2012, 2014
Campeonato Brasileiro Série D: 2012

Confiança
Campeonato Sergipano: 2017

Remo
Campeonato Paraense: 2018, 2019

References

External links
 Mimica at playmakerstats.com (English version of ogol.com.br)

1985 births
Living people
Brazilian footballers
Sampaio Corrêa Futebol Clube players
Vila Nova Futebol Clube players
Associação Desportiva Confiança players
Clube do Remo players
Associação Atlética de Altos players
Association football defenders
People from São Luís, Maranhão
Sportspeople from Maranhão